Caridina cantonensis var. blue tiger or blue tiger shrimp is a variety of freshwater shrimp from Southeast Asia that are popular in hobby aquariums. The natural coloration of the shrimp is blue of varying intensity, with black "tiger" stripes along its body. Variations of the species may also have orange eyes, and orange highlights in the tail fins.

They prefer very clean, soft water with a pH of 6.2-7.5 (preferring a pH of about 6.5), and a temperature of 69-81 degrees Fahrenheit.

Blue tiger shrimp are peaceful, non-aggressive omnivores, and live for 1–2 years.

Breeding 

Blue tiger shrimp are complex breeders—which means that they have no larval stage after hatching. Instead, the young are born as tiny versions of the adult—not more than 3mm in length, and grow to full size through molting. The gestation period is about 30 days. Caution must be taken with filtration when the young when they are in an aquarium, as they can be pulled into the intake.

The young of this species will resemble normal tiger shrimp, with their blue coloration becoming darker and more intense as the young mature.

References 
 Planetinverts.com 
 Planetinverts.com 
 Arizonainverts.com 
 Eliteinverts.com
 TheShrimpTank.com

Freshwater crustaceans of Asia
Atyidae